Madhya Pradesh United FC (or MPUFC) is an Indian football 2nd Division I-League club from Indore, Madhya Pradesh. MPUFC is the first football club from the state Madhya Pradesh to play in a national level league. The club is founded by Ravindra Parsai.

History
MP United FC was established in 2013 for improvement of football in the Central India. Over 9000 players play from over 1500 clubs across the state. As Madhya Pradesh was lacking a Professional Football team, MP United was established in Indore.

References

External links
 Club logo
 MP United

Football clubs in Madhya Pradesh
Sport in Indore
2013 establishments in Madhya Pradesh
Association football clubs established in 2013
I-League 2nd Division clubs